William Dickson (May 5, 1770February 21, 1816) was an American politician who represented Tennessee in the United States House of Representatives 1801 to 1807.

Biography
Dickson was born in Duplin County in the Province of North Carolina on May 5, 1770 and was educated at Grove Academy in Kenansville. With his parents, he moved to Nashville, Tennessee in 1795; studied medicine, then practiced as a physician. He married Polly Gray on August 19, 1802, in Nashville. They had three daughters and one son, Cornelia Ann Dickson, Indiana Dickson, Florida Dickson Baldwin and David Dickson. His second wife was Susannah Hickman. They had no children.

Career
Dickson entered politics as a member of the Tennessee House of Representatives, serving as its speaker from 1799 to 1803.

Elected as a republican, Dickson served as a U.S. representative for Tennessee for the Seventh, Eighth, and Ninth Congresses from March 4, 1801, to March 3, 1807. He became a friend of President Andrew Jackson during that time. He was a trustee of the University of Nashville from 1806 to 1816.

Death
Dickson died in Nashville on February 21, 1816 (age 45 years, 292 days). He is interred at a rural cemetery in Davidson County, Tennessee, near Nashville. Dickson County in Tennessee is named after him. A cousin of Molton Dickson, he was a member of the Freemasons.

References

External links

The Tennessean
U.S. Congress Biographical Directory entry

1770 births
1816 deaths
Speakers of the Tennessee House of Representatives
Democratic-Republican Party members of the United States House of Representatives from Tennessee
People from Duplin County, North Carolina
Members of the North Carolina Provincial Congresses